David M. Holtzman is an American physician-scientist known for his work exploring the biological mechanisms underlying neurodegeneration, with a focus on Alzheimer's Disease. Holtzman is former Chair of the Department of Neurology, Scientific Director of the Hope Center for Neurological Disorders, and associate director of the Knight Alzheimer's Disease Research Center at Washington University School of Medicine in St. Louis, Missouri. Holtzman's lab is known for examining how apoE4 contributes to Alzheimer's disease as well as how  sleep modulates amyloid beta in the brain. His work has also examined the contributions of microglia to AD pathology.

Early life and education 
Holtzman was born in St. Louis, Missouri. Holtzman pursued a six-year combined Bachelor's and Medical Degree at Northwestern University in Evanston, Illinois. He obtained his Bachelors of Science in Medical Education in 1983 and his Medical Degree in 1985.

After completing his MD, Holtzman pursued a residency in Neurology at the University of California, San Francisco (UCSF) from 1985 to 1989. Following his residency, he completed his postdoctoral research under the mentorship of William C. Mobley at UCSF from 1989 to 1994. His postdoctoral research focused on developing mouse models of neonatal stroke and neurodegeneration as well as elucidating the role neurotrophins play in modulating neuronal activity.

Career and research 
In 1994, Holtzman became an assistant professor at Washington University in St. Louis. By 2002, Holtzman was promoted to Associate Professor of Neurology, and by 2003, he was promoted to Full Professor in the Departments of Neurology and Developmental Biology at Washington University. In 2003, he also became the Chairman of the Department of Neurology, and in 2015 he became the Scientific Director of the Hope Center for Neurological Disorders.

Holtzman is currently Professor of Neurology, scientific director of the Hope Center for Neurological Disorders, and associate director of the Knight Alzheimer's Disease Research Center at Washington University School of Medicine. He stepped down from his position as department chairman in 2021.  The Holtzman Lab is dedicated to exploring the biological mechanisms underlying neurodegeneration. Holtzman's work has studied mechanisms by which apoE, amyloid beta, and tau metabolism are implicated in neurodegeneration in the context of Alzheimer's disease. Holtzman is also a co-founder of C2N Diagnostics, LLC. Holtzman and his former trainee, Randall Bateman, developed C2N Diagnostics in 2007 with the goal of increasing the understanding the molecular mechanisms underlying neurological diseases through measurements of concentration and metabolism of CNS-derived biomolecules.

Apolipoprotein E and Alzheimer's disease 
Holtzman and his lab have examined the role of apoE in AD pathogenesis. Both the ε4 and ε2 APOE alleles increase the risk of developing AD, with an approximately 12-fold AD risk for those with two copies of ε4 allele. Holtzman's Lab has shown that apoE contributes to AD susceptibility and pathogenesis by its modulation of Aβ clearance and aggregation. Specifically, they have found that different isoforms of apoE have differential effects on soluble Aβ clearance.

Immunotherapeutic approaches for Alzheimer's disease 
In 2001, Holtzman and his team published a paper showing that administration of the anti-Aβ antibody (m266) in mice changes the equilibrium of Aβ across the CNS and blood plasma leading to increased Aβ sequestration in plasma which reduces the burden of Aβ in the brain. This antibody, m266, was licensed to Eli Lilly and humanized.  Using the humanized anti-Aβ antibody, Solanezumab, Eli Lilly began a series of clinical trials to discern the therapeutic potential of anti-Aβ immunotherapy in humans with AD. Results of these trials were disappointing. Solanezunmab treatment did not meet the primary endpoint of the clinical trials in mild AD, however, a clinical trial known as A4 in “presymptomatic” AD is still ongoing. Holtzman's lab has also focused on anti-tau immunotherapeutic approaches to treating AD, and this approach is now in phase II clinical trials following licensing of an anti-tau antibody his lab developed with  AbbVie.

Amyloid and Synaptic Activity 
Along with other groups,  Holtzman and his team were able to discern that synaptic activity influences Aβ levels in the brain. They also found that Aβ deposition is brain region dependent, specifically correlating with regions involved in the default mode network. These findings suggest that increased metabolic demands and activity levels lead to higher soluble Aβ loads in these brain regions involved in the default mode network.

Sleep and Alzheimer’s Disease 
The Holtzman lab has made important advances in our understanding of how sleep cycles influence Aβ concentrations in the brain interstitial fluid and Cerebrospinal Fluid. They found that Aβ and tau are higher during wakefulness and lower during sleep, and that these differences in Aβ and tau dynamics are driven by synaptic activity differences and orexin signaling. Following this work, Holtzman and his team found that once Aβ has been deposited, it results in sleep disruptions and further Aβ aggregation in a positive feedback loop promoting increased pathology. They also found that sleep cycles are implicated in the release of extracellular tau and that less NREM sleep is linked to increased tau pathology.

Awards and honors 

 1995 Paul Beeson Physician Faculty Scholar Award (American Federation for Aging Research)
 2001 Charlotte and Paul Hagemann endowed Professorship, Dept. Neurology, Washington University  
 2003 Potamkin Award for Alzheimer's Disease Research, American Academy of Neurology
 2004 Elected American Society for Clinical Investigation
 2008 Member, Institute of Medicine (now National Academy of Medicine), National Academy of Sciences 
 2014 Elected Fellow of AAAS 
 2017 President, American Neurological Association
 2018 Member, National Academy of Inventors

Select publications 

 Holth JK, Fritschi SK, Wang C, Pedersen NP, Cirrito JR, Mahan TE, Finn MB, Manis M, Geerling JC, Fuller PM, Lucey BP, Holtzman DM. The sleep-wake cycle regulates brain interstitial fluid tau in mice and CSF tau in humans. Science. 2019 Feb 22;363(6429):880-884.
 Leyns CEG, Gratuze M, Narasimhan S, Jain N, Koscal LJ, Jiang H, Manis M, Colonna M, Lee VMY, Ulrich JD, Holtzman DM. TREM2 function impedes tau seeding in neuritic plaques. Nat Neurosci. 2019 Aug;22(8):1217-1222. doi: 10.1038/s41593-019-0433-0. PMCID:PMC6660358
Liao F, Li A, Xiong M, Bien-Ly N, Jiang H, Zhang Y, Finn MB, Hoyle R, Keyser J, Lefton KB, Robinson GO, Serrano JR, Silverman AP, Guo JL, Getz J, Henne K, Leyns CE, Gallardo G, Ulrich JD, Sullivan PM, Lerner EP, Hudry E, Sweeney ZK, Dennis MS, Hyman BT, Watts RJ, Holtzman DM. (2018) Targeting of nonlipidated, aggregated apoE with antibodies inhibits amyloid accumulation. J Clin Invest. 209(12):2149-56. PMCID: PMC3501350
 Yanamandra K, Kfoury N, Jiang H, Mahan TE, Ma S, Maloney SE, Wozniak DF, Marc, Diamond MI, Holtzman DM. Anti-tau antibodies that block tau aggregate seeding in vitro markedly decrease pathology and improve cognition in vivo. Neuron 2013 Oct 16;80(2):402-14. PMCID: PMC3924573
 Kang JE, Lim MM, Bateman RJ, Lee JJ, Smyth LP, Cirrito JR, Fujiki N, Nishino S, Holtzman DM. (2009) Amyloid- β  Dynamics Are Regulated by Orexin and the Sleep-Wake Cycle. Science. 326:1005-1008. PMCID:PMC2789838

References 

Living people
American neurologists
Northwestern University alumni
Feinberg School of Medicine alumni
People from Missouri
1961 births